Kalvis Mihailovs (born 23 February 1988) is a Latvian orienteering competitor.

He won a bronze medal in the relay at the 2007 Junior World Orienteering Championships in Dubbo. He competed at the 2012 World Orienteering Championships. In the middle distance he qualified for the final, where he placed 13th.

References

External links

1988 births
Living people
Latvian orienteers
Male orienteers
Foot orienteers
Junior World Orienteering Championships medalists